The wagtails, longclaws, and pipits are a family, Motacillidae, of small passerine birds with medium to long tails. Around 70 species occur in five genera. The longclaws are entirely restricted to the Afrotropics, and the wagtails are predominantly found in Europe, Africa, and Asia, with two species migrating and breeding in Alaska. The pipits have the most cosmopolitan distribution, being found mostly in the Old World, but occurring also in the Americas and oceanic islands such as New Zealand and the Falklands. Two African species, the yellow-breasted pipit and Sharpe's longclaw, are sometimes placed in a separate seventh genus, Hemimacronyx, which is closely related to the longclaws.

Most motacillids are ground-feeding insectivores of slightly open country. They occupy almost all available habitats, from the shore to high mountains. Wagtails prefer wetter habitats than the pipits. A few species use forests, including the forest wagtail, and other species use forested mountain streams, such as the grey wagtail or the mountain wagtail.

Motacillids take a wide range of invertebrate prey: insects are the most commonly taken, but also including spiders, worms, and small aquatic molluscs and arthropods. All species seem to be fairly catholic in their diets, and the most commonly taken prey for any particular species or population usually reflects local availability.

With the exception of the forest wagtail, they nest on the ground, laying up to six speckled eggs.

Description
They have long, pale legs with long toes and claws, particularly the hind toe, which can be up to 4 cm in length in some longclaws. No sexual dimorphism in size is seen. Overall, the robust longclaws are larger than the pipits and wagtails. Longclaws can weigh as much as 64 g, as in Fülleborn's longclaw, whereas the weight range for pipits and wagtails is 15–31 g, with the smallest species being perhaps the yellowish pipit. The plumage of most pipits is dull brown and reminiscent of the larks, although some species have brighter plumages, particularly the golden pipit of north-east Africa. The adult male longclaws have brightly coloured undersides. The wagtails often have striking plumage, including grey, black, white, and yellow.

Phylogeny
A molecular phylogenetic study published in 2019 sampled 56 of the 68 recognised species in the family Motacillidae and found that the species formed six major clades. The pipit genus Anthus was paraphyletic with respect to the longclaw genus Macronyx. The striped pipit (Anthus lineiventris) and the African rock pipit (Anthus crenatus) were nested with the longclaws in Macronyx. The type species of Anthus, the meadow pipit, was nested with the other Palearctic species in Clade 2.

Species and genera

Family: Motacillidae
 Genus Dendronanthus
 Forest wagtail,  Dendronanthus indicus
 Genus Motacilla: typical wagtails
Western yellow wagtail, Motacilla flava – possibly paraphyletic
Eastern yellow wagtail, Motacilla tschutschensis – possibly paraphyletic
Citrine wagtail, Motacilla citreola – possibly paraphyletic
Cape wagtail, Motacilla capensis
Madagascar wagtail, Motacilla flaviventris
Grey wagtail, Motacilla cinerea
Mountain wagtail, Motacilla clara
White wagtail, Motacilla alba – possibly paraphyletic
Pied wagtail, Motacilla alba yarrellii
Black-backed wagtail, Motacilla alba lugens
African pied wagtail, Motacilla aguimp
Mekong wagtail, Motacilla samveasnae
Japanese wagtail, Motacilla grandis
White-browed wagtail, Motacilla madaraspatensis
 São Tomé shorttail Motacilla bocagii
 Genus Tmetothylacus
 Golden pipit, Tmetothylacus tenellus
 Genus  Macronyx: longclaws
 Cape longclaw, Macronyx capensis
 Yellow-throated longclaw, Macronyx croceus
 Fülleborn's longclaw, Macronyx fuellebornii 
 Sharpe's longclaw, Macronyx sharpei - sometimes placed in genus Hemimacronyx
 Abyssinian longclaw, Macronyx flavicollis
 Pangani longclaw, Macronyx aurantiigula
 Rosy-throated longclaw, Macronyx ameliae
 Grimwood's longclaw, Macronyx grimwoodi
 Genus Anthus: typical pipits
 Richard's pipit Anthus richardi
Paddyfield pipit Anthus rufulus
Australian pipit Anthus australis
New Zealand pipit Anthus novaeseelandiae
African pipit Anthus cinnamomeus
Mountain pipit Anthus hoeschi
Blyth's pipit Anthus godlewskii
Tawny pipit Anthus campestris
Long-billed pipit Anthus similis
Nicholson's pipit Anthus nicholsoni
Wood pipit Anthus nyassae
Buffy pipit Anthus vaalensis
Plain-backed pipit Anthus leucophrys
Long-legged pipit, Anthus pallidiventris
Meadow pipit Anthus pratensis
Tree pipit Anthus trivialis
Olive-backed pipit Anthus hodgsoni
Pechora pipit Anthus gustavi
Rosy pipit Anthus roseatus
Red-throated pipit Anthus cervinus
Buff-bellied pipit Anthus rubescens
Water pipit Anthus spinoletta
European rock pipit Anthus petrosus
Nilgiri pipit Anthus nilghiriensis
Upland pipit Anthus sylvanus
Berthelot's pipit Anthus berthelotii
Striped pipit Anthus lineiventris
African rock pipit Anthus crenatus
Short-tailed pipit Anthus brachyurus
Bushveld pipit Anthus caffer
Sokoke pipit Anthus sokokensis
Malindi pipit Anthus melindae
Yellow-breasted pipit Anthus chloris - sometimes placed in genus Hemimacronyx
Alpine pipit Anthus gutturalis
Sprague's pipit Anthus spragueii
Yellowish pipit Anthus chii
Short-billed pipit Anthus furcatus
Pampas pipit Anthus chacoensis
Correndera pipit Anthus correndera
South Georgia pipit Anthus antarcticus
Ochre-breasted pipit Anthus nattereri
Hellmayr's pipit Anthus hellmayri
Paramo pipit Anthus bogotensis
 Madanga Anthus ruficollis

References

External links

Motacillidae videos on the Internet Bird Collection

 
Bird families